Arild Linneberg (born 26 January 1952) is a Norwegian researcher of literature, literary critic, essayist and translator.

Early life and career 
He was born in Oslo, and is a Doctor of Philosophy by education. He became a lecturer at the University of Bergen in 1985, and was promoted to professor in 1992. In addition to his academic works, he has published essays as well as the satirical novel Ubehaget i kulturen together with Vigdis Hjorth in 1995.

References

1952 births
Living people
Norwegian literary critics
Norwegian translators
Norwegian essayists
Academic staff of the University of Bergen
Writers from Oslo